The Trans-Sulawesi Railway, is a railway network in the Indonesian island of Sulawesi. The first phase includes 146 kilometers route from Makassar to Parepare, which was completed in November 2022 and has been operating ever since. The total plan for the railway would be around 2,000 kilometres spanning from Makassar to Manado. Most of other sections are still under construction.

The Trans-Sulawesi Railway are built with  standard gauge which is wider than the  cape gauge used in Java and Sumatra to accommodate more weight and speed.

Routes

Makassar-Parepare
The ground breaking of Makassar–Parepare route was conducted on 18 August 2014 in, Siawung Village, Barru District, Barru Regency. On early November 2022, 66 kilometres of railway from Barru to Pangkep was inaugurated and operational. As of 2022, it is the only operational part of the railway.

References

Standard gauge railways in Indonesia
Railway lines in Indonesia
Rail transport in Indonesia
Rail infrastructure in Indonesia
Transport in South Sulawesi